David Sloan (28 October 1941 – 4 February 2016), was a Northern Irish professional footballer who played for Scunthorpe United, Oxford United and Walsall. He also made two international appearances for Northern Ireland while at Oxford United, in the process becoming the first player to receive an international cap whilst at the club.

References

External links
 
 
 

1941 births
2016 deaths
Association footballers from Northern Ireland
Walsall F.C. players
Scunthorpe United F.C. players
Oxford United F.C. players
Northern Ireland international footballers
English Football League players
Bangor F.C. players
Association football midfielders
Sportspeople from Lisburn